Pretty Things are an English rock band.

Pretty Things may also refer to:

The Pretty Things (album), a 1965 album by the band
The Pretty Things/Philippe DeBarge, another album by the band
Pretty Things (album), a 1970 album by jazz saxophonist Lou Donaldson
 "Oh! You Pretty Things", a 1971 song by David Bowie
Pretty Things (2001 film), a film directed by Gilles Paquet-Brenner and based on Virginie Despentes's 1998 novel Les Jolies Choses
Pretty Things: the Last Generation of American Burlesque Queens, a 2006 book by Liz Goldwyn
Pretty Things (2005 film), a documentary film by Liz Goldwyn
 "Pretty Things", a 2010 song by Take That from Progress

See also 
"Pretty Thing", a 1955 song by Bo Diddley
Dirty Pretty Things (disambiguation)
 Pretty Little Thing (disambiguation)
 Pretty Young Thing (disambiguation)
 Ugly Things